Guillaume Le Touze (born 1968 Le Havre) is a French writer.

Biography
After holding various jobs, he was recruited as a designer for the publishing house L'Ecole des Loisirs, who published his first children's book in 1991. His first novel for adults followed in 1992.

He received the 1994 Prix Renaudot, for Comme ton père.

Works 
Comme tu as changé, éditions de l'Olivier, 1992; Actes Sud, 2009, 
Comme ton père, éditions de l'Olivier, 1994; Éditions de l'Olivier, 1995, 
Etonne-moi, éditions de l'Olivier, 1997, 
Dis-moi quelque chose, Actes Sud, 1999, 
Tu rêves encore, Actes Sud, 2001, 
Attraction, Actes Sud, 2005,

Children's works
 J'entends le silence des chaussures de Papa, L'Ecole des Loisirs, 1991
 Leopold préfère les fauves, L'Ecole des Loisirs, 1992
 Dommage que ce soit un secret, L'Ecole des Loisirs, 1994
 Les crocodiles ne pleurent plus, L'Ecole des Loisirs, 1995
 L'important c'est d'y croire, L'Ecole des Loisirs, 1995
 A cause de la cheminée, L'Ecole des Loisirs, 1996
 On m'a oublié, L'Ecole des Loisirs, 1996
 Seule au monde, Gallimard Jeunesse, 1998
 Les nuits de Léo, Ed.Actes Sud junior, 2006, 
 Les ogres pupuces, Actes Sud-Papiers, 2008,

Filmography
He worked on the script of Nés en 68 (2008), a film by Olivier Ducastel and Jacques Martineau.

References

External links
http://lesjardinsdhelene.over-blog.com/article-5713958.html
http://thierrycollet-cetalir.blogspot.com/2011/03/comme-ton-pere-guillaume-le-touze.html

1968 births
Writers from Le Havre
Prix Renaudot winners
Living people
French male writers